The 2018–19 Liga Națională is the 61st season of Liga Națională, the Romanian top-level women's professional handball league. The league comprises 14 teams. CSM București are the defending champions, for the fourth season in a row.

Team changes

To Liga Națională
Promoted from Divizia A
 Gloria Buzău
 Minaur Baia Mare

From Liga Națională
Relegated to Divizia A
 Slobozia
 Rapid București

Teams for season 2018–19

League table

Promotion/relegation play-offs
The 3rd and 4th-placed teams of the Divizia A promotion tournament faced the 11th and 12th-placed teams of the Liga Națională. The first two places promoted to Liga Națională and the last two relegated to Divizia A. The play-offs were played on neutral ground, in Cisnădie.

Season statistics

Number of teams by counties

References

External links
 Romanian Handball Federaration 

Liga Națională (women's handball)
2018 in Romanian sport
2019 in Romanian sport
2018–19 domestic handball leagues